John Abney Culberson (born August 24, 1956) is an American attorney and politician who served in the United States House of Representatives from 2001 to 2019. In his 2018 re-election campaign, he was defeated by Democrat Lizzie Fletcher. He subsequently began work as a lobbyist.

Early life, education, and career
Culberson was born in Houston, the son of Eleanor (née Abney) and James Vincent Culberson. His great-grandmother was Swedish. Culberson attended Lamar High School. He graduated from Southern Methodist University (SMU) in 1981 with a degree in history. He earned his Juris Doctor degree from South Texas College of Law in 1989.

Texas House of Representatives
During his time in law school, Culberson was elected to the Texas House of Representatives, serving his first term beginning in 1987. He was a member of the Republican Whip team, becoming Minority Whip in 1999 during his last term. Culberson began working for the law firm of Lorance and Thompson as a civil defense attorney after he graduated from law school.

On August 1, 2008, to protest the House going into summer recess without discussing a pending energy bill, Culberson and other House Republicans stayed to make speeches about the energy bill in question. The Democratic leadership in the House, which controls services in the chamber, responded by cutting the microphones and cameras. Culberson used social media services Twitter and Qik to provide a live account of the proceedings. Culberson later compared this episode to the Iranian government's crackdown against dissidents who used Twitter to protest a restriction on foreign media in June 2009.

U.S. House of Representatives

Elections

2000 

Culberson won the Republican nomination for the 7th District in 2000 after 15-term incumbent Bill Archer announced his retirement. His state house district included much of the congressional district's western portion. He finished first in the Republican primary — traditionally the real contest in what has historically been a heavily Republican district – and defeated Peter Wareing in the runoff. He won easily in November, taking about 75% of the vote.

2008 

In 2008, Culberson defeated businessman Michael Peter Skelly with 56% of the vote. It was only the second time that a Democrat had even crossed 40 percent of the vote in this district.

2010 

Culberson ran unopposed.

2012 

Culberson was challenged by the Democratic nominee James Cargas, an energy lawyer for the City of Houston, Green party nominee Lance Findley, and Libertarian Drew Parks.

2014 

In the November 4, 2014 general election, Culberson again defeated Democrat James Cargas, who polled 4,092 votes (62.1 percent) in the March 4 primary election. Culberson was unopposed in the Republican primary.

2016 

Culberson defeated James Lloyd and Maria Espinoza in the Republican primary election on March 1. Culberson polled 44,202 votes (57.3 percent) to James Lloyd's 19,182 (24.9 percent) and the third candidate, Maria Espinoza's 13,772 (17.8 percent).

He secured his eighth term in the general election held on November 8, when, with 143,542 votes (56.2 percent), he defeated the Democrat James Cargas (born 1966) of Houston, who garnered 111,991 ballots (43.8 percent).

After Hillary Clinton carried Culberson's 7th district in the 2016 presidential election, Democrats began to regard the congressman as vulnerable in 2018.

2018 

Culberson defeated Edward Ziegler in the Republican primary with 76% of the vote. Lizzie Pannill Fletcher was the Democratic nominee and defeated him in the general election by a 52.3% to 47.7% margin. Culberson held his own in his longtime base of west Houston and Memorial, much of which he'd represented for over three decades at the state and federal levels. However, Fletcher swamped him in the district's share of southwest Houston that were added in the 2004 redistricting, as well as in the Bear Creek area.

Committee assignments
 Committee on Appropriations
 Subcommittee on Commerce, Justice, Science, and Related Agencies (Chairman)
 Subcommittee on Homeland Security
 Subcommittee on Military Construction, Veterans Affairs, and Related Agencies

Caucuses
 Congressional Caucus on Turkey and Turkish Americans
 Congressional Constitution Caucus
 Republican Study Committee
 Tea Party Caucus
Congressional Constitution Caucus

Political positions
Culberson had described himself as a "Fiscally conservative 'Jeffersonian Republican'... committed to Thomas Jefferson's vision of limited government, individual liberty, and states' rights."

As of April 2018, he had voted with his party in 97.6% of votes in the 115th Congress and voted in line with President Trump's position in 98.6% of the votes.

Abortion 
Culberson supported pro-life legislation.

ACORN 
Three years after the Association of Community Organizations for Reform Now (ACORN) had been dissolved, Culberson included language in an appropriations bill that said "None of the funds made available in this Act may be distributed to the Association of Community Organizations for Reform Now (ACORN) or its subsidiaries or successors."

Budget 
Culberson generally opposed an income tax increase, opposed reducing defense spending in order to balance the budget, opposed federal spending as a means of promoting economic growth, and supported lowering corporate taxes as a means of promoting economic growth.

Disaster relief
Culberson was the only Texas Republican to support the $50.7 billion relief effort after Hurricane Sandy. As a member of the U.S. House Appropriations Committee, Culberson has been active in seeking aid in the wake of Hurricane Harvey.

Donald Trump 
Culberson was the first person to endorse Ted Cruz in the 2016 U.S. presidential primaries. In June 2016, Culberson said "I always have and always will support the Republican nominee. The party should unify behind the presumptive nominee, Donald Trump, to defeat Hillary Clinton."

In February 2017, he voted against a resolution that would have directed the House to request 10 years of Trump's tax returns, which would then have been reviewed by the House Ways and Means Committee in a closed session. He supports the construction of a wall along the Mexican border, and supports requiring immigrants who are unlawfully present to return to their country of origin before they are eligible for citizenship.

Culberson supported President Donald Trump's 2017 executive order to suspend the refugee resettlement program and curtail immigration from seven Muslim-majority countries. He stated that "This is a necessary pause in the refugee program until our intelligence agencies can develop adequate background checks to ensure that the people coming into the country are coming in for the right reasons."

Environment 
Culberson rejects the scientific consensus on climate change. He has alleged that scientists have falsified climate change data. He has said that "the liberal obsession with climate change... is driven by their desire to raise more money for the government". He opposes cap-and-trade programs and the federal regulation of greenhouse gas emissions. He supports government funding for the development of renewable energy.

Culberson had a lifetime score of 4% from the League of Conservation Voters.

Guns
In 2016, Culberson wrote a letter to Attorney General Loretta Lynch threatening to block President Obama's executive order on guns by defunding the United States Department of Justice.

Healthcare 
Culberson opposed the Patient Protection and Affordable Care Act (Obamacare) and supported its repeal. On May 4, 2017, Culberson voted to repeal Obamacare and pass the American Health Care Act of 2017. The AHCA would have allowed insurers to charge seniors five times as much for health coverage than younger people (the ACA limit was three times as much) and allowed insurers to raise premiums on individuals with preexisting conditions who did not have continuous coverage.

In 2013, Culberson said "like 9/11, 'let's roll!'" to describe a vote to make a delay of the Patient Protection and Affordable Care Act a condition for funding the government.

Presidential citizenship
In 2009, Culberson co-sponsored legislation which would require all future presidential candidates to provide proof of their citizenship when filing to run for office. The legislation was in response to Barack Obama citizenship conspiracy theories which questioned the legitimacy of Barack Obama's birth certificate.

Science 
Culberson marked up a 2016 spending bill to include a requirement that the National Science Foundation direct about 70% of its funding to biology, computing, engineering, and math and physical sciences. The earmarked funds would not cover geoscience and the social and behavioral sciences.

In 2008, he expressed concern about foreign-born students coming to the United States to obtain advanced academic degrees and then returning to their countries of origin. He  opposes requiring states to adopt federal education standards.

Culberson was a strong advocate for the multiple flyby and lander missions to the Jovian moon Europa.  When he lost his seat to his Democratic opponent Lizzie Pannill Fletcher in the 2018 election, support for the lander mission declined.

References

External links

 
 

|-

|-

|-

1956 births
21st-century American politicians
Methodists from Texas
American people of Swedish descent
Lamar High School (Houston, Texas) alumni
Living people
Republican Party members of the Texas House of Representatives
People from Houston
Republican Party members of the United States House of Representatives from Texas
South Texas College of Law alumni
Southern Methodist University alumni
Tea Party movement activists